Echinolittorina lemniscata is a species of sea snail, a marine gastropod mollusk in the family Littorinidae, the winkles or periwinkles.

Description
The shell size varies between 6 mm and 10 mm

Distribution
This species is distributed in the Pacific Ocean along the Galapagos Islands

References

External links
 Gastropods.com : Echinolittorina galapagiensis; accessed : 16 February 2011

Littorinidae
Gastropods described in 1846